"American Dream" is a song by English DJ Jakatta. The track samples two Thomas Newman pieces from the soundtrack for the 1999 film American Beauty: "American Beauty" and "Dead Already". A spoken-word sample from "Two of Hearts" by Stacey Q also appears on the track. The single peaked at  3 on the UK Singles Chart and also reached the top 40 in Belgium, Ireland, and Spain. A remix of the song was released in mid-2001 and peaked at No. 63 in the UK. The majority of the track is in  time, which is unusual for dance music, which is typically is  time.

Track listings

UK CD single
 "American Dream" (radio edit)
 "American Dream" (Joey Negro club mix)
 "American Dream" (DifferentGear remix)

UK 12-inch single
A. "American Dream" (Joey Negro club mix)
B. "American Dream" (DifferentGear remix)

UK 12-inch single (remixes)
A. "American Dream" (Lucid remix)
B. "American Dream" (Commie remix)

UK cassette single and European CD single
 "American Dream" (radio edit) – 3:22
 "American Dream" (Joey Negro club mix) – 7:08

US 2×12-inch single
A1. "American Dream" (club mix) – 7:09
A2. "American Dream" (radio edit) – 3:23
B1. "American Dream" (DifferentGear remix) – 8:13
B2. "American Dream" (After Life mix) – 4:23
C1. "American Dream" (Ski Oakenfull Dream On mix) – 8:59
D1. "American Dream" (Commie remix) – 9:02
D2. "American Dream" (Lucid remix) – 7:19

Australian CD single
 "American Dream" (radio edit) – 3:20
 "American Dream" (Joey Negro club mix) – 7:05
 "American Dream" (DifferentGear remix) – 8:10
 "American Dream" (Lucid remix) – 7:17

Credits and personnel
Credits are lifted from the UK CD single liner notes.

Studios
 Recorded at Soundquest (London, England)
 Mastered at Masterpiece (London, England)

Personnel

 Thomas Newman – writing ("Dead Already", "American Beauty")
 John Dixon Mitchell – writing ("Two of Hearts")
 Sue Gatlin – writing ("Two of Hearts")
 Tim Greene – writing ("Two of Hearts")
 Swati Natekar – vocals
 Dave Lee – production, mixing
 K-Boy Brooks – engineering
 Richard Searle – engineering
 Greg Moore – mastering

Charts and certifications

Weekly charts
Original version

Remix

Year-end charts

Certifications

Release history

References

2000 songs
2000 singles
2001 singles
Atlantic Records singles
Big Beat Records (American record label) singles
Dave Lee (DJ) songs
Ministry of Sound singles